McKinlay Hendry Ltd v Tonkin & Taylor Ltd is a cited case in New Zealand regarding the Contracts (Privity) Act 1982 and pre-incorporation contracts.

References

Court of Appeal of New Zealand cases
New Zealand contract case law
2005 in New Zealand law
2005 in case law